Jones Branch may refer to:

Jones Branch (Marshyhope Creek tributary), a stream in Sussex County, Delaware
Jones Branch (Crooked Creek), a stream in Missouri
Jones Branch (One Hundred and Two River), a stream in Missouri
Jones Branch (Pee Dee Creek), a stream in Missouri
Jones Branch (South Fabius River), a stream in Missouri